Carl Franz Bally (October 24, 1821, Schönenwerd – August 5, 1899) was a Swiss businessman who founded the Bally Shoe company in 1851.

Early life 
Carl Franz Bally was the 11th of 14 children of Peter Bally (1783–1849) and Anna Maria Herzog. His grandfather, Franz Ulrich Bohli (1748–1810) immigrated as a young man from Vorarlberg in west part of Austria to Schönenwerd in the Canton of Solothurn in Switzerland, working as a mason for a manufacturer of silk ribbons. Later, he established his own silk ribbon manufacture in that town, relying mostly on work outsourced to local weavers. His sons Peter and Niklaus continued and enlarged the firm producing also suspenders and elastic fabrics and building an extensive second facility in Säckingen, Germany.

Career 
Carl Franz, one of the ten sons of Peter, entered the business at age 17 concentrating on the newest products. During a business trip to Paris he visited a shoe manufacturing plant and began to think about producing shoes, founding his own small facility in 1851.

After initial difficulties the business began to flourish and in the early 1870s he established sales organizations in Buenos Aires (Argentina), Montevideo, (Uruguay) and Paris, (France). To fill the need for workers he opened small manufacturing facilities in several towns in the surrounding region.

By 1880 Bally had transformed Schönenwerd from a sleepy farm village to an industrial center offering employment to hundreds of workers from the surrounding area, ultimately developing it into one of the w’s leading shoe manufacturing enterprises. Around the turn of the century, the firm employed some 3200 workers and produced over two million pairs of shoes a year. 

He also served as a lawmaker in various local and federal positions.

Social initiatives 
Carl Franz was a progressive liberal, pushing forward many new ideas in the town, now taken for granted. He and his wife opened a special education school for girls, a kindergarten, an old-age home and a public swimming facility at the bordering Aare river. He built homes for workers and converted a flood region of the Aare in town into a luscious, publicly accessible park. He fought battles to break the long established bond between school education and religion and supported the establishment of improved schooling facilities for grade schools and a regional middle school.

Personal life 
Carl Franz and his wife Cecile Rychner (1823–1893) had two sons, Eduard and Arthur, who continued their father’s business under the name C. F. Bally Söhne. 

Carl Franz Bally died in Basel in 1899.

Further reading

 O. von Däniken, Schönenwerd, Olten: Walter-Verlag, 1974
 C. Scalabrin (ed), Pioneer und Pfaffenschreck, Baden: hier + jetzt, 2009

References

External links

1821 births
1899 deaths
People from Olten District
Swiss Old Catholics
Liberal Party of Switzerland politicians
Members of the National Council (Switzerland)
Swiss businesspeople